Louis Herbert Barker (3 July 1925 – 3 March 2001) was an Australian rules footballer who played with Footscray in the Victorian Football League (VFL).

Notes

External links 

1925 births
2001 deaths
Australian rules footballers from Melbourne
Western Bulldogs players
Braybrook Football Club players
Royal Australian Air Force personnel of World War II
Royal Australian Air Force airmen
People from Footscray, Victoria
Military personnel from Melbourne